Honister Pass is a mountain pass in the English Lake District. It is located on the B5289 road, linking Seatoller, in the valley of Borrowdale, to Gatesgarth at the southern end of Buttermere. The saddle at the watershed is known as Honister Hause, using the Cumbrian word hause for such a feature.

Honister Pass is one of three passes that link the tourist area around  Keswick, including Derwent Water and Borrowdale, with the valley of the River Cocker, including the lakes of Buttermere, Crummock Water and Loweswater. From north to south these passes are Whinlatter Pass, Newlands Pass and Honister Pass.

Honister Slate Mine and Honister Hause Youth Hostel are located at the summit of the pass.

Footpaths lead from the summit of the pass to Fleetwith Pike to the west, Grey Knotts to the south, and Dale Head to the north.

Honister Pass holds the UK 24-hour rainfall record; in the 24 hours to 6 pm on 5 December 2015, 341.4 mm of rain fell there.

See also
List of hill passes of the Lake District

References

External links
Streetmap.co.uk: map of Honister Pass
Visit Cumbria: Honister Pass
Honister Hause Youth Hostel

Roads in Cumbria
Mountain passes of the Lake District